Icaria is a Greek island.

Icaria or Ikaria may also refer to:

Icarians, a utopian movement
SS Ikaria, a steamship
Icaria (wasp), a genus of wasp
Ikaria wariootia, a species of early bilaterian animal.
Icaria (film), a Russian fantastic drama film